Baab-As-Salaam (Arabic باب السلام), pronounced as "bāb assalām", is one of the gates at the Great Mosque of Mecca in Saudi Arabia. This phrase in Arabic when literally translated into English means "Gate of Peace". It has been a tradition for first time visitors to the mosques to enter the Great Mosque of Mecca through this gate. This gate is located in the stretch between Mount Safa and Marwaah.

There's a gate of Masjid an-Nabawi with the same name of as-Salam Gate as well.

References 

Islamic architecture